Typhoon Kai-tak, also known in the Philippines as Typhoon Edeng, was a typhoon that formed in July 2000 and brought severe impacts to the Philippines and Taiwan.

Meteorological history 

On July 2, a low pressure area formed north west of the Philippines and became a tropical depression on July 3 and started to drift northward, becoming a storm on the 5th and a typhoon on the 6th. Kai-tak continued northward, hitting Taiwan on the 9th. Kai-tak changed to an extratropical cyclone in the Yellow Sea on the 11th. This extratropical cyclone landed near the Dandong city of the Liaodong Peninsula and changed course to the east, and disappeared on the 12th.

Name 
This typhoon was named after Hong Kong's old international airport, Kai Tak Airport. PAGASA gave the storm the name Edeng.

Impact 

The combined effects of Kai-tak and Tropical Depression Gloring led to the collapse of the Payatas dumpsite, a large garbage pile, devastating a scavenger community with 300 shanty homes near Manila. At least 218 people died in the avalanche — some of whom were decapitated by machinery — and at least 73 others were injured. 160 people were killed and 150 were missing on Luzon due to heavy rain and landslides. In Taiwan, a wind of 80 knots or more when landing caused a power outage of more than 3,000 units, killing one person. The China Meteorological Administration allegedly suffered an economic loss of $82 million in Zhejiang and elsewhere.

References 

2000 Pacific typhoon season
Typhoons in China
2000 in China
2000 in the Philippines
Typhoons in the Philippines
Typhoons in Taiwan
2000 in Taiwan